Dario is a genus of very small chameleonfishes native to streams and freshwater pools in China (Yunnan), India (northeastern part of the country and Western Ghats) and Myanmar.

Species
There are currently 6 recognized species in this genus:

 Dario dario F. Hamilton, 1822
 Dario dayingensis S. O. Kullander & Britz, 2002
 Dario huli Britz & P. H. A. Ali, 2015
 Dario hysginon S. O. Kullander & Britz, 2002
 Dario kajal Britz & S. O. Kullander, 2013
Dario melanogrammus Britz, S. O. Kullander & Rueber, 2022
Dario tigris Britz, S. O. Kullander & Rueber, 2022
 Dario urops Britz, P. H. A. Ali & Philip, 2012

References

Badidae
Ray-finned fish genera
Taxa named by Sven O. Kullander
Taxa named by Ralf Britz